= Judy Markey =

American radio personality (1944–2026)

Judy Markey (1944 - September 11, 2026) was an American radio personality, journalist, and author. She was the co-host of the Kathy and Judy Show on WGN-AM 720 from 1989 to 2009.
